The 1895 Centre football team represented Centre College as an independent the 1895 college football season. Led by Richard T. Lowndes in his first and only season as head coach, Centre compiled a record of 4–1–1.

Schedule

References

Centre
Centre Colonels football seasons
Centre football